Teddy Cruz (born 1962 in Guatemala City, Guatemala) is an American architect, urbanist, Professor in Ancient Architecture and Urbanism in the Visual Arts Department at the University of California, San Diego. Cruz studied at Rafael Landivar University in Guatemala City, Guatemala, but moved to the United States at the age of 20, continuing his education at California State Polytechnic University, San Luis Obispo, and the Harvard Graduate School of Design in Cambridge, Massachusetts.

Cruz is the founder and president of Estudio Teddy Cruz + Fonna Forman, a research-based political and architectural practice based in San Diego, in partnership with University of California, San Diego political theorist, Fonna Forman. Cruz and Forman lead a variety of urban curatorial initiatives, including The Civic Innovation Lab in the City of San Diego to rethink public space and civic engagement; the UCSD Cross-Border Initiative to promote research and practice focused on regional territories of poverty; and the UCSD Community Stations, to foster corridors of knowledge exchange between the university and marginalized communities. Additionally, they collaborated with former Bogota Mayor Antanas Mockus to develop the Bi-national Citizenship Culture Survey, an unprecedented protocol that surveyed cross-border civic infrastructure, public trust and social norms, to generate new shared urban policies between the municipalities of San Diego and Tijuana, as well as collaborative strategies for cross-border urban intervention.

Cruz's architectural and intellectual projects have been exhibited at internationally renowned venues, including: the Tijuana Cultural Center, Museum of Contemporary Art San Diego, Carnegie Museum of Art, Walker Art Center, San Francisco Art Institute, Casa de America in Madrid, Spain, and Small Scale, Big Change: New Architectures of Social Engagement at the Museum of Modern Art.  Apart from his design work, Cruz's project at UCSD, Community Stations, champions the mutual exchange of knowledge between universities and communities, the latter of which he feels have their own valuable resources and assets that are often overlooked.

References

External links
 
 

1962 births
Living people
American architects
Harvard Graduate School of Design alumni
California Polytechnic State University alumni